George Anders (born 1957) is an American business journalist and the author of five books, including the New York Times bestseller,  Perfect Enough. He has worked as an editor or staff writer at The Wall Street Journal, LinkedIn, Fast Company magazine and Bloomberg View. He currently resides in Northern California.
Anders's articles and essays have appeared in publications  including The New York Times, BusinessWeek, The Atlantic, The Guardian, and the Harvard Business Review.

Early life and education
Anders is a 1978 graduate of Stanford University, with a bachelor's degree in economics. At Stanford, he was elected to the Phi Beta Kappa honor society.

Career
Anders has been writing for national publications since the 1980s. He started his writing career working for The Wall Street Journal and eventually became a top feature writer, specializing in in-depth profiles. A 1996 profile of electronics salesman Jeff Bloom, and his battle to regain his health after being diagnosed with AIDS, became part of a package of Journal articles awarded the Pulitzer Prize for National Reporting. Anders's 1998 article on Healtheon's difficulties developing medical-record software was seen as a major reason why the company soon afterward postponed its much-awaited initial public offering. In The New New Thing, author Michael Lewis wrote that when Healtheon CEO Mike Long read the Journal article he "knew instantly that the roadshow was over."

After his first stint with The Wall Street Journal, Anders served as West Coast bureau chief for Fast Company from 2000 to 2003. Anders rejoined the Journal in 2003 and left in 2008. He later became a founding member of the Bloomberg View board of editors and began working for Forbes as a contributing writer in 2012. In October 2017, he joined LinkedIn's editorial team, where he is a senior editor at large.

Awards and honors
He shared in a Pulitzer Prize for National Reporting  in 1997, while at The Wall Street Journal.
On May 19, 2018, he was awarded an honorary doctorate by Washington & Jefferson College, where he delivered the 2018 commencement address.

Bibliography

Books

Critical studies and reviews of Anders' work
 Review of You can do anything''.

References 

1957 births
Stanford University School of Humanities and Sciences alumni
American business and financial journalists
American male journalists
Living people
20th-century American journalists